Vitomir Belaj (born November 8, 1937 in Maribor, Slovenia) is a Croatian ethnologist. In 1979 he received his PhD at Faculty of Humanities and Social Sciences, University of Zagreb. There was a professor since 1985, and since 2009 as emeritus professor. In his career, Belaj particularly studied ethnological history and mythological background of Slavs and Croats.

Selected works
Utemeljitelj hrvatske etnologije dr. Antun Radić (1966) (master's thesis)
Kultni vrtići u Jugoslaviji i njihov etnološki okvir (1979) (doctoral dissertation)
Die Kunde vom kroatischen Volk. Eine Kulturgeschichte der kroatischen Volkskunde (1998) 
Hod kroz godinu. Mitska pozadina hrvatskih narodnih običaja i vjerovanja (1998, 2007) 
Sveti trokuti. Topografija hrvatske mitologije (with Juraj Belaj; 2014)

Awards
1998: Croatian State Award in Science (:hr:Državna nagrada za znanost)
2006:  Milovan Gavazzi Award for lifetime achievement, Croatian Ethnographic Society

References

External links

1937 births
Living people
Croatian ethnologists
Writers from Maribor